Tommy Malone (29 July 1918 – 16 June 1968) was an Irish basketball player. He competed in the men's tournament at the 1948 Summer Olympics.

References

External links
 

1918 births
1968 deaths
Irish men's basketball players
Olympic basketball players of Ireland
Basketball players at the 1948 Summer Olympics
People from New Ross
Sportspeople from County Wexford